David Steinberg (born 1942) is a Canadian comedian, actor, writer, director, and author.

David Steinberg may also refer to:

 David Steinberg (crossword editor) (born 1996), crossword constructor and editor
 David Steinberg (journalist) (1932–2017), American journalist and president of PR Newswire
 David A. Steinberg (born 1970), American businessman
 David H. Steinberg, screenwriter
 David J. Steinberg (1965–2010), American actor
 David I. Steinberg (born 1928), American historian